The 2017–18 season was Klubi i Futbollit Tirana's 79th competitive season, first ever season in the Kategoria e Parë and 97th year in existence as a football club.

Season overview

June
Tirana's relegation for the first time in history created a mass exodus at the club, with Afrim Taku, Gilman Lika, Olsi Teqja leaving the team immediately after they contract run out.

Later on 16 June, Tirana announced the signing of manager Zé Maria.

On 19 June Tirana acquired the services of Ugandan striker Yunus Sentamu after having originally signed an agreement in January 2016. One the same day, Brazilian midfielder Wellyson completed a transfer to Tirana by becoming the second purchase of transfer market.

Two days later, manager Zé Maria published the official list for the 2017–18 UEFA Europa League first qualifying round. The youngsters Realf Zhivanaj, Elvi Berisha and Rei Qilimi were promoted for the first time at senior squad.

Tirana lost the first leg against Maccabi Tel Aviv 2–0 at Netanya Stadium.

July
In the returning leg on 6 July, Tirana was defeated 3–0 at home and was eliminated from the competition 5–0 on aggregate. On 12 July, Moise Nkounkou terminated the contract with Tirana unilaterally which led the club to send the case to UEFA where they emerged victorious; the played was forced to give Tirana €100,000 compensation.

August
On 10 August, Merveille Ndockyt who had a breakthrough season in his first year at Tirana, was sold at La Liga club Getafe for €400,000. One day after that, second goalkeeper Edvan Bakaj terminated the contract with the club due to lack of playing time.

On 15 August, Elvi Berisha who debuted with senior team in the qualifying rounds of Europa League, was sold at Leganés B for €90,000.

On 24 August, defender David Domgjoni was transferred to Kosovan side Liria for an undisclosed fee. A day after, young defender Fjoralb Deliaj left the club as a free agent after being told by manager Zé Maria that he was not in his plans. On 28 August, Reuben Acquah was sold at LASK Linz for €250,000. On the same day, Uganda international player Tony Mawejje completed a transfer to Tirana by penning a contract until June 2019 with an option to renew. On 29 August, Alvaro Bishaj joined the club on a three-year contract at the request of manager Zé Maria.

September
On 2 September, Tirana signed English striker Michael Ngoo on a one-year contract with the possibility of a renewal for a second year. Two days later, Çelhaka joined the club on a deal running until June 2020. Çelhaka was presented alongside Bedri Greca who signed a two-year contract for an undisclosed fee.

Tirana played their first domestic match on 6 September in the 2017 Albanian Supercup. Tirana won 1–0 thanks to late winner of Erion Hoxhallari to clinch their 11th title in history. Tirana also set a record by becoming the Kategoria e Parë side to win the Supercup.

On 7 September, after three months as free agent, Ifeanyi Edeh rejoined Tirana on a one-year contract. He however departed from the club on 24 September to pursue a career outside the continent.

Tirana begun their Albanian Cup campaign on 13 September by winning 2–1 away over Besa Kavajë in the first leg of first round. Karabeci scored both goals, including one with penalty. Three days later they played their first ever Kategoria e Parë match on 16 September by defeating Iliria Fushë-Krujë 1–0 at home. Tony Mawejje scored the lone goal.

On 22 September Tirana announced the purchase of midfielder Hardy Binguila on a three-year contract. He was presented at Selman Stërmasi Stadium and was given squad number 10. In the second matchday against Pogradeci, Tirana easily won 3–0 at Gjorgji Kyçyku Stadium. Sentamu and Ngoo were the authors of goals.

In the returning leg of Albanian Cup first round, Tirana won 2–0 thanks to Ngoo brace to progress to next round 4–1 on aggregate. On 29 September, after having initially assigned to reserve squad, goalkeeper Alessio Abibi was given clearance to join the first squad. He signed a three-year contract.

On 27 September was the draw for the second round of Albanian Cup. The team will play against Vllaznia Shkodër.

Tirana finished the month by winning another three league points, this time by beating Naftëtari Kuçovë 3–0 at home. Sentamu was on the score sheet twice while Karabeci scored the other goal.

October
Tirana begun October by winning 6–0 at Shkumbini Peqin. The goals were scored by six different players. It was also the fourth consecutive clean-sheet for Ilion Lika. The team continued their sublime form in league by winning 2–0 over Turbina Cërrik at home to extend the league gap. Nggo and Greca scored the goals for Tirana. The win was followed by another one in the next week as the team won 2–0 versus Tomori Berat with the goals of Karabeci and Sentamu.

November
In the first match of November, Tirana suffered a 0–1 home loss to Bylis Ballsh. Niko Zisi scored the lone goal of the match. For Tirana it was the first league defeat of the season and the first goal conceded after 540 minutes. Zé Maria called the defeat "a shame". Tirana bounced back fast, however, winning 2–0 versus Apolonia Fier on 18 November. Alked Çelhaka scored his first Tirana goal while Grent Halili for his first league goal for Tirana in his 33rd appearance.

Tirana dropped again points on matchday 9 on 25 November against Shënkolli. Karabeci scored for Tirana with penalty as the team finished the match with 10 players following the sent off of Çelhaka. On 29 November, goals from Greca and Wellyson secured a 2–0 home win over Vllaznia in the first leg of Albanian Cup second round.

December
Tirana's December began with a visit to the Redi Maloku Stadium to take on Iliria on 9 December. Tirana achieved an easy 3–0 win thanks to Daja, Turtulli and Karabeci goals. In the returning leg of Albanian Cup second round at Loro Boriçi Stadium versus Vllaznia Shkodër, Tirana was defeated 0–1 but progressed through thanks to the 2–0 win in the first leg. The team however played for one hour with one man less due to Erion Hoxhallari's sent-off following an brawl with Ardit Krymi. He was suspended for two matches by AFA. Following the end of the match the police violated the Tirana players which prompted the club to denounce. On the same day was announced that Tirana was going to play Kukësi in the quarter-finals of Albanian Cup.

Back in the league, the team scored 6 times in the match against Pogradeci to equal the best victory achieved in October versus Shkumbini Peqin. Sentamu scored a hat-trick which was followed by Qilimi, Halili and Ngoo goals. In the last match of 2017, Tirana recorded another big victory, winning 0–4 at Naftëtari Kuçovë, finishing Group B at first place. Karabeci, Ngoo, Sentamu and Bardhi scored the goals.

January
On 2 January, the club terminated by mutual consent the contract with Brazilian Wellyson who signed a three-year contract with Swedish outfit AFC Eskilstuna. The announcement was made three days later. On 9 January, young defender Marlind Nuriu was sent on loan for remainder of the season at fellow capital club Dinamo Tirana to gain more experience. On 12 January, the club announced their winter training camp schedule; the preparation phase is going to take place in Antalya, Turkey and the team would also play in three friendlies. Priror to that, Tirana released Ditmar Shehri, Mateus Levendi, Alvi Ahmetaj and several other players from the youth ranks. Flamur Bajrami was sent on loan at Vëllaznimi of Football Superleague of Kosovo for the remainder of the season.

The team played their first friendly on 18 January; the draw 1–1 against Kazakhstan Premier League outfit Tobol with Greca scoring Tirana's only goal. Tirana played their second friendly two days later; they draw 2–2 against SKA-Khabarovsk with Sentamu and Daja scoring for Tirana. Tirana finished their winter training camp by earning another draw, this time against Cherno More.

On 20 January 2018, the club announced their first two signings of winter transfer window; Kenneth Muguna joined the club on a -year contract while Mohammed Musa signed a -year contract. Five days later, midfielder Samson Iliasu was signed from Mohammedan Sporting Club and was sent on loan at Kastrioti Krujë on deadline day until the end of the season.

Tirana played their first competitive match of 2018 on 28 January; the team on 3–0 versus Shkumbini Peqin with the goals of Ngoo, Qilimi and Vrapi. Back in Albanian Cup three days later, Tirana despite dominating most of the game with one player less, was not able to win at home versus Kukësi as the match ended 1–1.

February
Tirana started February by earning a 2–1 comeback win at Nexhip Trungu Stadium versus Turbina Cërrik; Greca and Ngoo goals were enough 5th consecutive league win. In the next league match six days later, Tirana continued their winning run after beating 3–1 Tomori Berat at home; Ngoo scored a brace which was followed by Greca's goal.

Back in cup, in the second leg of Albanian Cup quarter-finals, Tirana lost 0–1 thanks to an early Kukësi goal scored by Sindrit Guri which sealed Tirana elimination from the competition 1–2 on aggregate. In the next league match against promotion contenders Bylis Ballsh, Tirana took the advantage by netting with Yunus Sentamu in the dying seconds of first half injury time. However, the hosts bounced back and scored with a controversial penalty with Maringlen Shoshi.

In the penultimate match of regular season, Tirana didn't go more than a goalless draw against Apolonia Fier.

March
On 3 March, in the final match of regular season, Tirana overwhelmed Shënkolli by winning 4–1, ending the regular phase as leaders with 45 points, four more than Bylis Ballsh. Tirana's lead was cut short in half due to new rules applied by Albanian Football Association for the 2017–18 season, meaning they were only two points ahead of Bylis.

The team played their first play-off match on 11 March against Pogradeci, winning 3–0 thanks to the strikes of Ngoo, Greca and Halili. This win was followed by the next one six days later against Tomori Berat. The team won 2–1 at home thanks to the goals of Sentamu and Ngoo. Goalie Ilion Lika was injured during the match after a collision with an opposition player and was taken off.

On 26 March, Michael Ngoo, who until now had scored 13 goals and provided 7 assists, suffered a major injury during the training session which ruled him out for the remainder of the season. Tirana played their third promotion play-off match on 28 March against Apolonia Fier; they won 5–1 thanks to the braces scored by Greca and Muçi and a goal from Karabeci, which helped Tirana to extend the league lead.

April
Tirana begun April by recording a 2–0 win against their closest rival Bylis Ballsh. The team scored in the 2nd with in-form Bedri Greca just seconds after Erando Karabeci missed a penalty. Greca scored the second goal in the 27th minute which gave Tirana the win. Tirana officially secured their promotion to top flight next season by winning 3–2 at home against Pogradeci. An owngoal from Hysenllari and goals from Grend Halili and Bedri Greca secured the win.

After clinching the spot for the next season's Albanian Superliga, Zé Maria decided to play in the next game against Tomori Berat with a young and inexperienced team, consisting players from the B squad. The team however managed a 2–2 draw. On 27 April, the youngster Ernest Muçi signed his first professional contract, a two-year deal until June 2020. In the last match of April, Tirana managed a narrow 1–0 win against Apolonia Fier thanks to the winner of Jurgen Vrapi in 31st minute.

May
On 8 May, Tirana were deducted three points due to financial obligations to its former player Gjergji Muzaka. In the final match of promotion Group B, Tirana defeated Bylis Ballsh 2–1 thanks to the brace of Bedri Greca to claim the trophy of Group B. The goals scored in this match made Greca the joint Tirana topscorer along with Yunus Sentamu.

On 16 May, in the Kategoria e Parë final against the Group A winners, Kastrioti Krujë, Tirana recorded a 2–0 win thanks to another brace for the man of the moment Bedri Greca to win the trophy of Kategoria e Parë for 2017–18 season.

Players

Squad information

From youth squad

Transfers

Transfers in

Transfers out

Loans out

Pre-season and friendlies

Competitions

Kategoria e Parë

League table

First phase

Second phase

Results summary

Results by round

Matches

Regular

Promotion play-off

Final

Albanian Cup

First round

Second round

Quarter-finals

Albanian Supercup

UEFA Europa League

First qualifying round

Statistics

Squad stats
{|class="wikitable" style="text-align: center;"
|-
!
! style="width:70px;"|League
! style="width:70px;"|Europe
! style="width:70px;"|Cup
! style="width:70px;"|Supercup
! style="width:70px;"|Total Stats
|-
|align=left|Games played       ||27 || 2 || 6 || 1 || 36
|-
|align=left|Games won          ||22 || 0 || 3 || 1 || 26
|-
|align=left|Games drawn        || 4 || 0 || 1 || 0 || 5
|-
|align=left|Games lost         || 1 || 2 || 2 || 0 || 5
|-
|align=left|Goals scored       ||70 || 0 || 7 || 1 || 78
|-
|align=left|Goals conceded     ||13 || 5 || 5 || 0 || 23
|-
|align=left|Goal difference    ||55 ||–5 || 2 || 1 || 53
|-
|align=left|Clean sheets       ||16 || 0 || 2 || 1 || 19
|-

Top scorers

Last updated: 16 May 2018

Clean sheets
The list is sorted by shirt number when total appearances are equal.

Last updated: 16 May 2018

References

External links
Official website

KF Tirana seasons
Tirana
Tirana